This list comprises all players who have participated in at least one league match for Miami Fusion from the team's first Major League Soccer season which took place in 1998, until its final season in 2001. Players who were on the roster but never played a first team game are not listed; players who appeared for the team in other competitions (US Open Cup, CONCACAF Champions League, etc.) but never actually made an MLS appearance are noted at the bottom of the page.

A "†" denotes players who only appeared in a single match.

A
  Lazo Alavanja
  Jeremy Aldrich
  Bill Andracki †
  Shaker Asad †

B
  Keith Beach †
  Kyle Beckerman
  Jeff Bilyk
  Ian Bishop
  Jason Boyce
  Scott Budnick

C
  Jeff Cassar
  Judah Cooks †
  Ramiro Corrales †
  Leo Cullen

D
  Brian Dunseth

G
  Roberto Gaúcho
  Mario Gori
  Edwin Gorter
  Henry Gutierrez

H
  Jay Heaps
  Chris Henderson
  Marcelo Herrera
  Dusty Hudock

K
  Brian Kamler
  Kris Kelderman
  Matt Kmosko
  Matt Knowles
  Cle Kooiman
  Alen Kozić
  Tony Kuhn

L
  Garth Lagerwey
  Roy Lassiter
  Carlos Llamosa

M
  Martín Machón
  John Maessner
  Pete Marino
  Tyrone Marshall
  Joey Martinez
  Saul Martínez
  Pablo Mastroeni
  Ivan McKinley
  Randy Merkel †

N
  Matt Napoleon

O
  Francis Okaroh

P
  Arley Palacios
  Carlos Parra
  Paulinho
  Alex Pineda Chacón
  Preki

R
  Nick Rimando
  Maurizio Rocha
  Jim Rooney

S
  Tim Sahaydak
  Diego Serna
  Gregory Simmonds
  Dan Stebbins

T
  Jerry Tamashiro
  Bryan Taylor
  Roger Thomas
  Johnny Torres
  Mickey Trotman

V
  Carlos Valderrama
  Nelson Vargas
  David Vaudreuil

W
  Wade Webber
  Welton
  Andy Williams
  David Winner
  Ian Woan †
  Eric Wynalda

Notes

Sources
 

Miami Fusion
 
Association football player non-biographical articles